Nowtarki-ye Tahmasebi (also Romanized as Nowtarkī-ye Ţahmāsebī; also known as Nowtargī-ye Ţahmāsebī) is a village in Howmeh-ye Gharbi Rural District, in the Central District of Izeh County, Khuzestan Province, Iran. At the 2006 census, its population was 220, in 45 families.

References 

Populated places in Izeh County